The Fishery Minister (Faroese language: landsstýrismaðurin í fiskuvinnumálum or Fiskimálaráðharrin) is a member of the government of the Faroe Islands.

Notes and references 

Fisheries
Fisheries Ministers of the Faroe Islands